Nelson & Colne College is situated in the town of Nelson, Lancashire, North West of England, providing Further Education to Pendle and the surrounding districts. It is a tertiary college, offering courses to post-16 students, adult learners and those in employment looking to gain new or additional qualifications.

History
Founded during the reorganisation of education in Pendle in the early 1970s, Nelson & Colne College was created by a merger of a number of local sixth forms. Since then the college has grown in size, currently serving the educational needs of around 2,400 full-time students and 10-15,000 part-time students, depending on the time of year.
The college merged with Accrington & Rossendale College on 30 November 2018.

Courses
The college offers a variety of courses including GCSEs and A Levels, in addition to vocational accreditations such as NVQs and National Diplomas. The college also works together with local companies to provide training for apprenticeships and trainees, utilising many funding streams including the government's Train to Gain initiative.

Encompassing both day and evening classes, the courses on offer are many and varied. In addition to traditional academic subjects such as English, Maths, Sociology, Psychology, Languages, History and Science,  the college offers courses in Beauty Therapy, Hairdressing, Engineering, IT, Drama, Media and Music Technology.

Professional qualifications such as Teaching Assistant and AAT Qualifications (Association of Accounting Technicians) can be obtained at the college and more unusual courses such as Horticulture, Urdu, Pottery and Website Design are offered.

Facilities
In addition to the Learning Resource Centre, there is a new internet café, a student's common room, a fitness centre and a large dining refectory.

New Build

In order to amalgamate the college onto one campus, Nelson & Colne College gained funding of over £20 million, which allowed for the provision of new buildings and refurbishment of some existing facilities.

Facilities include a sports hall large enough to accommodate six tennis courts and a fitness centre. There are also hairdressing and beauty therapy salons with modern resources allowing students to offer commercial treatments.

In addition to these new buildings, the remainder of the college has also undergone a transformation, with new dining and social areas including a cybercafé, specialist facilities for students requiring additional support, refurbished science laboratories. The engineering workshops have also been refitted. The central concourse between the main building and the Pendle and Deerstone buildings is currently in the process of renovation, expanding the library and its computer facilities whilst providing more seating for students on a lunch time (the new build will mostly be glass). The grounds to the rear of the college are also being renovated with the addition of a large AstroTurf pitch to further improve sporting facilities, the car park will also be extended.

Alumni
Andrew Scarborough - actor who starred as Tim Drewe in Downton Abbey. 
Thomas Morrison - Actor (who played the role of Hooper in the recent adaptation of Brideshead Revisited)
Phil Woolas - M.P.
Paul Griffiths - CEO of Babycakes Clothing
Paul Waring
Jessica Forest - Actress (who plays Leanne in Hollyoaks)
Julia Haworth - Actress (who played Claire Peacock in ITV's Coronation Street)
Rachel Brown - International footballer
Steven Burke - Olympic cyclist for Great Britain

References

External links
Official College website
College listing at Aimhigher
College's Results at A-Level

Buildings and structures in the Borough of Pendle
Education in the Borough of Pendle
Learning and Skills Beacons
Nelson, Lancashire
Further education colleges in Lancashire
Educational institutions established in 1972